Buglawton is a suburb of Congleton, in the south-east of Cheshire. It was a parish and an urban district (i.e. effectively an independent town) from 1894 until 1936, when it was incorporated in Congleton borough. In 1931 the parish had a population of 1651.

The Urban District Council consisted of six elected members and five officers, the latter including a council clerk, a surveyor and a rate and rent collector. The council was responsible for quite a large geographical area, greater in size than the borough of Congleton at that time though smaller in population and in buildings. Most of the 2580 acres which comprised the parish of Buglawton was used for dairy farming and the Council's area was generally more rural than industrial. The bulk of the population, however, lived and worked in a small area adjacent to the River Dane. The parish church of St John was built in 1841.

The area of the former parish includes the hamlets of Timbersbrook, Key Green, Crossley and Havannah, Cheshire plus the Cheshire side of the Cloud.

Buglawton was formerly a township and chapelry in Astbury parish, from 1866 Buglawton was a civil parish in its own right until it was abolished on 1 April 1936 and merged with Congleton, Eaton and North Rode.

Etymology
The name "Buglawton" means 'Mound farm/settlement', the 'Hob-goblin' to distinguish from Church Lawton.

Notable residents
Buxton House, 23 Buxton Road, Buglawton, CW12 2DW was the residence of Elizabeth Clarke Wolstenholme Elmy from 1874 to 1918 and a Blue Plaque was erected there for her by the Congleton Civic Society; it reads, "Elizabeth Wolstenholme-Elmy 1839-1918 Campaigner for social, legal and political equality for women lived here 1874-1918". Benjamin Elmy founded the Male Electors' League for Women's Suffrage in 1897, the first all male society to specifically campaign for women to have the vote. Elmy's son, Frank Elmy was elected to the Urban District Council in 1904 and was employed as assistant overseer and rate collector for Buglawton Urban District Council.

See also

Buglawton Hall

References

External links

 - Buglawton Primary School

Villages in Cheshire
Former civil parishes in Cheshire
Congleton